Yagoua is a town and commune in the Far North Province of Cameroon. It is the capital of the department of Mayo-Danay.

Administrative structure 
Localities are::

Climate
Yagoua has a hot semi-arid climate (BSh) with little to no rain from October to April and moderate to heavy rainfall from May to September.

Gallery

References

Populated places in Far North Region (Cameroon)
Communes of Cameroon